Poggio Bustone is a  (municipality) in the Province of Rieti in the Italian region of Latium, located about  northeast of Rome and about  north of Rieti.

Poggio Bustone borders the following municipalities: Cantalice, Leonessa, Rieti, Rivodutri.

St. Francis 

St Francis of Assisi went to Poggio Bustone in 1208 and reputedly greeted the villagers by saying "buon giorno buona gente" (good morning good people) A gothic arch named "buon giorno" can be found in the village commemorating this event.

In the oldest section of the Franciscan monastery of Poggio Bustone, a room can be found where St. Francis stayed. On the mountainside above the village are seven small chapels containing, by tradition, impressions of objects relating to St. Francis, such as his knee. This path culminates with the small church Sacro Speco where St. Francis received forgiveness for his sins from the Archangel Gabriel.

People
Attilio Piccioni (1892–1976), Italian politician
Lucio Battisti (1943–1998), Italian singer and songwriter

Twin towns
 San Benedetto del Tronto, Italy, since 2009

References

Cities and towns in Lazio